Joris Chougrani (born 30 March 1991) is a French professional footballer who plays as left-back for Ligue 2 club Rodez AF.

Professional career
Chougrani is a youth product of Rodez AF, having joined the club at the age of 12. He made his professional debut with Rodez in a 2–0 Ligue 2 win over AJ Auxerre on 26 July 2019.

Personal life
Born in France, Chougrani is of Algerian descent.

References

External links
 
 

1991 births
Living people
Sportspeople from Lot (department)
Association football fullbacks
French footballers
French sportspeople of Algerian descent
Rodez AF players
Ligue 2 players
Championnat National players
Championnat National 2 players
Championnat National 3 players
Footballers from Occitania (administrative region)